Say the Word was the fifth and final single released by the Duran Duran offshoot band, Arcadia. Recorded for the soundtrack of Playing for Keeps, it was released as a single in the US by Atlantic Records.

Music video
The original video was an amalgam of previous Arcadia videos, interspersed with scenes from the film.

A new version that keeps an amalgam of previous Arcadia videos, but removed the interspersed scenes from the film was released on Duran Duran's official YouTube page.

Vinyl Releases and Track listing

7": Atlantic. / 7-89370 (Red Atlantic Label w/Picture Sleeve) (US)
 "Say the Word" (Theme from "Playing for Keeps") (LP version) - (4:29) 
 "Say the Word" (Instrumental Mix) - (4:31)
 The original version on the "Playing for Keeps" soundtrack has a length of 5:07, the labelling of the A-side on the single release as the "LP version" is a misprint.

7": Atlantic. / PROMO/ 7-89370 (Blue Atlantic Label w/Picture Sleeve) (US)
 "Say The Word" (Theme from "Playing for Keeps") (LP version) - (4:29)
 "Say The Word" (Theme from "Playing for Keeps") (LP version) - (4:29)
 The original version on the "Playing for Keeps" soundtrack has a length of 5:07, the labelling of the A-side on the single release as the "LP version" is a misprint.

7": Atlantic. / PROMO / 78-93707 (Red Atlantic Label w/Solid Center Small Hole and WEA Company Sleeve)(CA)
 "Say the Word" (Theme from "Playing for Keeps") (LP version) (4:29)
 "Say the Word" (Theme from "Playing for Keeps") (Instrumental Mix) (4:29)

7": Atlantic. / 78-93707 (Red Atlantic Label w/Large Center Hole and WEA Company Sleeve) (CA)
 "Say the Word" (Theme from "Playing for Keeps") (LP version) (4:29)
 "Say the Word" (Theme from "Playing for Keeps") (Instrumental Mix) (4:29)

 All Canadian releases contains a misspressing with an incorrect song, which is instrumental, that has a time of 3:31.  
 According to Nick Rhodes, who listened to the unknown song in January 2009, this track is not Arcadia and it seems as if a pressing plant error caused an unknown artist to be substituted instead of the instrumental Arcadia track, which does actually exist and appears in its correct form on the US 7-inch release.

12": Atlantic / PROMO / PR939 (Green and Orange Atlantic Label and Generic White Sleeve w/Atlantic Promo Sticker) (US)
 "Say the Word" (Theme from "Playing for Keeps") (Extended Remix) - (6:39)
 "Say the Word" (Theme from "Playing for Keeps") (Instrumental Extended Remix) - (5:49)
 This record was only released as a promotional 12 inch in the United States. No stock copies were ever made.

Other appearances
Albums:
 Playing for Keeps OST
So Red The Rose Reissued 2010 version.

Credits

Engineer [Remix] – Michael Hutchinson
Producer – Alex Sadkin, Arcadia (band) 
Producer [Additional Production], Remix – Shep Pettibone
Written-By – Simon Le Bon, Nick Rhodes

References

1986 singles
Arcadia (band) songs
1985 songs
Songs written by Simon Le Bon
Songs written by John Taylor (bass guitarist)
Song recordings produced by Alex Sadkin
Parlophone singles